Arnaud Boetsch was the defending champion but lost in the first round to Bernd Karbacher.

Mark Philippoussis won in the final 6–1, 5–7, 6–4 against Magnus Larsson.

Seeds
A champion seed is indicated in bold text while text in italics indicates the round in which that seed was eliminated.

  Marcelo Ríos (semifinals)
  Cédric Pioline (quarterfinals)
  Arnaud Boetsch (first round)
  Mark Philippoussis (champion)
  Marc Rosset (second round)
  Paul Haarhuis (first round)
  Mark Woodforde (semifinals)
 n/a

Draw

References
 1996 Grand Prix de Tennis de Toulouse Draw

1996 Singles
1996 ATP Tour